The Honourable William Middleton Noel (2 May 1789 – 20 January 1859), was a British politician.

Background
Noel was the third son of Sir Gerard Noel, 2nd Baronet, and Diana, Baroness Barham, daughter of Admiral Charles Middleton, 1st Baron Barham. Charles Noel, 1st Earl of Gainsborough, was his elder brother.

Political career
Noel succeeded his father as Member of Parliament for Rutland in 1838, a seat he held until 1840. He served a year as High Sheriff of Rutland for 1850.

Family
Noel married Anne, daughter of Joseph Yates, in 1817. They had no children. She died in October 1851. Noel survived her by eight years and died in January 1859, aged 69.

References

External links 
 

1789 births
1859 deaths
High Sheriffs of Rutland
Younger sons of barons
Younger sons of baronets
Members of the Parliament of the United Kingdom for English constituencies
UK MPs 1837–1841
William